Pennsylvania Route 58 (PA 58) is located in Western Pennsylvania, running 71.2 miles from Ohio State Route 5 (SR 5) at the Ohio state line  west of Jamestown in Mercer County to PA 68 in Sligo in Clarion County.

Route description

Mercer and Butler counties

The two routes join together and continue eastward nearly  where US 322 leaves northward. PA 58 continues eastward, then turns southeasterly, and about  later, joins PA Route 18 just north of the Greenville borough line. The concurrency continues  into the borough to its junction with PA Route 358. The three routes form a concurrency and head westward – this segment is what is known as a wrong way concurrency, because PA 58 is signed east at the same time that Route 358 is signed west. Here, the route first meets the US 19/US 62 concurrency. The three routes form a concurrency south  to the intersection of PA Route 258. At this complex intersection, the concurrency ends, US 62 continues westward, concurrent with Route 258, US 19 continues south, and Routes 58 and 258 join to the east. Also at this point, the PA 58/PA 258 concurrency is split – eastbound follows South Diamond Street, and westbound follows North Diamond Street in the middle of town. At the east end of the “square,” the concurrency ends as Route 258 heads southward and PA 58 continues east, then later turns southeast. In Grove City, the route intersects with the southern terminus of the PA Route 173/PA Route 208 concurrency, and overlaps with Route 173, continuing southeast.

A mile after entering Butler County, PA 58 intersects with PA Route 8 in the borough of Harrisville. The next major intersection is about  later at PA Route 38 in the borough of Eau Claire. The route then travels nearly  before crossing the next county line. The road spends about 18.5 miles in Butler County, serving as the main thoroughfare across the rural northern portion of the county.

Armstrong and Clarion counties
PA 58 has a very short stay in Armstrong County, passing through its extreme northwestern tip.  Just  from the county line, the route intersects with PA Route 268, it then crosses Allegheny River on the Foxburg Bridge, leaving the county just about  later.

Turning northeasterly, the route passes through the borough of Foxburg upon entering Clarion County, and then heads northeast to enter the borough of St. Petersburg a little over  later. Here, PA 58 intersects with the eastern terminus of PA Route 478, and then about  later, it intersects with the western terminus of PA Route 338 at the village of Alum Rock. The route then winds southeastward  to intersect with the eastern terminus of PA Route 368 just east of the borough of Callensburg.
The road spends 13 miles in Clarion County.

History

The route was originally signed in 1927 from New Wilmington to Greenville on the current PA 18 alignment.
The route was moved in 1928 to the Mercer-to-Greenville alignment.
Connecting PA 458 was decommissioned and reassigned as PA 58 in 1946, extending the route from its previous western terminus at US 322 in Jamestown to its current location at the Ohio state line.
In 1967 the eastern terminus was moved from PA 8 in Harrisville to its current location.

Major intersections

Attractions
Pymatuning State Park near Jamestown

See also

References

External links

Pennsylvania Highways: PA 58

058
Transportation in Mercer County, Pennsylvania
Transportation in Butler County, Pennsylvania
Transportation in Armstrong County, Pennsylvania
Transportation in Clarion County, Pennsylvania